Below is a list of Vietnamese exonyms for various places around the world:

History 
Historical exonyms include place names of bordering countries, namely Thailand, Laos, China, and Cambodia.

During the expansion of Vietnam (Nam tiến), some place names have become Vietnamized.

Many non-Vietnamese places may have more than one name in Vietnamese as shown below.

Sino-Vietnamese exonyms 
Before modernity, sources of foreign place names in Vietnam came from documents that were mostly written in Classical Chinese. So many exonyms derive directly from Chinese pronunciations (see: Chinese exonyms). This in turn got transliterated into the Vietnamese, sinoxenic pronunciations of the Chinese characters (also called Sino-Vietnamese pronunciation). For example, Scotland is rendered as 蘇格蘭 in Chinese. This is pronounced as Sū-gé-lán in Mandarin Chinese, a somewhat faithful transcription of the original name. However, as applied to all Chinese characters, 蘇格蘭 can be transliterated into Vietnamese as Tô Cách Lan, which strays a bit further from the native English and Scots name. A major issue using Chinese characters to transcribe words is the fact that Chinese characters can be pronounced drastically differently among all the spoken languages and dialects that use them, which include Mandarin, Cantonese, Japanese, Korean, and Vietnamese among several others, the majority of which have dramatically different phonologies and phonemes from each other. By the nature of the writing system itself, Chinese characters tend to preserve a word's syllable count, morphemes, and meanings more reliably than they do as an accurate representation of the word's pronunciation, considering that the Chinese character system itself primarily represents logograms (though some have elements of phonetic information) as opposed to phonemes of the language. The use of Sino-Vietnamese exonyms has become archaic during recent times, and only some countries such as France, the US, Russia, Australia, Russia, India and most European countries retain the Sino-Vietnamese pronunciations. Even so, many of the aforementioned countries also have exonyms more accurate to the native pronunciations of their respective endonyms. Currently, the countries still called by their Sino-Vietnamese names are: China, Egypt, India, Japan, Korea, Mongolia, Russia, Thailand, Turkey, Austria, Belgium, Denmark, Finland, France, Germany, Greece, Italy, Netherlands, Norway, Poland, Portugal, Spain, Sweden, Switzerland, the UK, England, the US and Australia. London and Pyongyang are the only 2 city in Europe and Korea known by the Sino-Vietnamese name.

Exonyms from other languages 
In modern times, Vietnamese has relied less on Sino-Vietnamese-derived exonyms and it has become more common for Vietnamese exonyms to more accurately transcribe the endonym according to its native language. Thus, place names outside of East Asia can often be respelled in a way that Vietnamese can pronounce it using a transcription method called Vietnamization. For example, although Scotland can be called by its Sino-Vietnamese exonym, Tô Cách Lan, spellings such as Xcốt-len and Scôtlen are also acceptable. This method has more general patterns than steadfast rules, depending on the writer. For example, the name 'Saddam Hussein' can be spelled as Sađam Hutxen, Sátđam Hutxen, or Saddam Hudsein. This is similar to native to how English speakers spelled their own names in various and inconsistent ways before English spelling became fossilized. For example, William Shakespeare spelled his own surname at least 3 different ways.

However, it has recently become more common for the English exonym or the romanization of the endonym to be written without any changes to spelling, though Vietnamese readers may still pronounce the name using a Vietnamese accent. In some cases, the name may retain an unchanged spelling, but a footnote may appear regarding how to pronounce the name in Vietnamese. For example, in the Harry Potter series of novels, the spelling of names for characters "Marge" and "Filch" remains unchanged, but footnotes exist to help Vietnamese speakers pronounce their names, which are written as "Mạc" and "Fít" respectively.

There are a few country names borrowed from French and Russian as Vietnam's history is closely linked to France and Russia. Countries whose names borrow from French are: Morocco, Cyprus, Lebanon, Saudi Arabia, Czech. And the countries whose names borrowed from Russian are Georgia and Lithuania. Vienna (Viên in Vietnamese) is the only city whose name in Vietnamese is borrowed from French. Hong Kong and Macau names are borrowed from English by direct transliteration into Hồng Kông and Ma Cao instead of Hương Cảng and Áo Môn in Sino-Vietnamese pronunciation.

Other cases 
The names of Cambodia and Laos are directly transcribed from Khmer and Lao into Vietnamese as Campuchia and Lào. The names of Phnom Penh, Vientiane and Bangkok are directly transcribed from Khmer, Lao and Thai into Vietnamese as Phnôm Pênh, Viêng Chăn and Băng Cốc. Ivory Coast is translated into Vietnamese as Bờ Biển Ngà, and at times it is transcribed from French as Cốt Đivoa.

Afghanistan

Albania

Algeria

Argentina

Australia

Austria

Bahrain

Belarus

Belgium

Brazil

Bulgaria

Cambodia

Canada

China

Cyprus

Czechia

Denmark

East Timor

Egypt

Eritrea

Estonia

Ethiopia

Finland

France

Georgia

Germany

Greece

Iceland

India

Indonesia

Iran

Iraq

Ireland

Israel

Italy

Japan 
While some Japanese have Sino-Japanese names, others have native Japanese names (yamato kotoba), or a combination of both, the Vietnamese names for these cities are based on the Sino-Vietnamese pronunciations of the kanji used to write their names. However, using the endonym is far more common than the Vietnamese exonym.

Jordan

Kazakhstan

Kyrgyzstan

Laos

Latvia

Libya

Lithuania

Luxembourg

Malaysia

Moldova

Mongolia

Montenegro

Morocco

Mexico

Myanmar

Netherlands

New Zealand

North Korea

North Macedonia

Norway

Pakistan

Philippines

Poland

Portugal

Qatar

Romania

Russia

Saudi Arabia

Singapore

South Africa

South Korea

Spain

Sri Lanka

Sweden

Switzerland

Taiwan

Thailand

Tunisia

Turkey

Ukraine

United Arab Emirates

United Kingdom

United States

The most common name for America in Vietnamese, Hoa Kỳ, means "Flower Flag" in Vietnamese, in reference to the United States' flag.

Other

References

 Lữ-y Đoan. Sấm truyền ca Genesia. Montréal: Tập san Y sĩ, 2000.
 Phạm Phú Thứ. Nhật ký đi Tây. HCM: Đà Nẵng, 1999.

See also 

Lists of exonyms
Vietnamese language